Glens Falls Cemetery is a historic cemetery located at Glens Falls, Warren County, New York.  It was established in 1853 as a 13-acre cemetery and expanded in 1871, 1888, and five times between 1913 and 1973 to a total of 38 acres.

History
In 1853, the village purchased 13 acres from Andrew Porteus of Queensbury, New York for the sum of $1000, with $500 set aside for grading and fencing. The first burial took place in 1855, but there are several older markers which were moved here from the old West Street Cemetery in the early 1870s.

After several expansions, the cemetery now spans 32 acres with over 12,000 burials.

Notable interments
 Harry Elkes (1878–1903), champion bicycle racer who died during a race in 1903
 Orange Ferriss (1814–1894), US Congressman
 Franklin Johndro (1835–1901), Union Army soldier in the American Civil War who received the Medal of Honor
 Frederick A. Johnson (1833–1893), US Congressman
 George Merrill (1847–1925),  a Union Army soldier during the American Civil War who received the Medal of Honor
 "Broncho Charlie" Miller, the last Pony Express rider, died in 1955, claiming to be 105 years old.
 Joseph Russell (1800–1875), US Congressman

Notable structures
The Memorial Chapel (1946) is a small, front gabled stone building with a slate roof.  The cemetery office (1950) is a concrete stucco finished building with a peaked slate roof.  The cemetery includes a number of notable burial monuments and mausoleum.

It was added to the National Register of Historic Places in 2004.

Gallery

See also
 National Register of Historic Places listings in Warren County, New York

References

External links

 

Cemeteries on the National Register of Historic Places in New York (state)
1853 establishments in New York (state)
Cemeteries in Warren County, New York
National Register of Historic Places in Warren County, New York